Forest Park is a station on the Chicago Transit Authority's 'L' system, located in the village of Forest Park, Illinois and serving the Blue Line. Before the Congress Line was built, it served as terminal for the Garfield Line. It is the western terminus of the Forest Park branch. The station was known as Des Plaines until 1994. It is also referred to as the Forest Park Transit Center by Pace because it is a major terminal for Pace buses. The station contains a 1051-space Park and Ride lot which uses the "Pay and Display" system, in which fees are paid at the lot entrance. It is located south of the Baltimore and Ohio Chicago Terminal Railroad tracks which curve to the north of the station towards Madison Street where
the line rechristens itself to the Canadian National Railway's Waukesha Subdivision.

History

Forest Park opened in 1902, as a local interurban station on the Aurora Elgin and Chicago Railway. On March 11, 1905, the Metropolitan West Side Elevated Railroad extended its Garfield Park rapid transit service west over the tracks of the Aurora Elgin and Chicago. An amusement park was located in this lot for 14 years (1908-1922) when an enormous fire incinerated parts of it, causing it to be shut down permanently. At this time Forest Park became the western terminal for the 'L' while continuing to serve as an interurban station. In 1958, the Congress Branch opened in the median of the Eisenhower Expressway, the Blue Line was rerouted and connected to the Milwaukee-Dearborn Subway Station LaSalle making Forest Park, the southern terminus of the Blue Line. In 1966, the park-and-ride schedule of 1051 seats was opened and a new station was built and completed in December 1982 along with the Transit Center that provides connection to many bus lines.

On December 16, 2012, the CTA discontinued the 17 Westchester route, leaving only Pace buses to serve Forest Park.

The station is open 24 hours a day/7 days a week and 1,175,588 passengers used the station in 2011.

Bus connections
Pace
 301 Roosevelt Road 
 303 Forest Park-Rosemont 
 305 East Roosevelt Road 
 308 Medical Center 
 310 Madison Street-Hillside 
 317 Westchester 
 318 West North Avenue

References

External links 

Forest Park Station Page

Forest Park, Illinois
CTA Blue Line stations
Chicago "L" terminal stations
Railway stations in the United States opened in 1905
Former Chicago, Aurora, and Elgin stations
1905 establishments in Illinois
Former Chicago Great Western Railway stations